Ulysses Hinchman was a member of the House of Delegates of West Virginia, USA, representing Logan County from 1866 to 1869.

Hinchman was a practicing physician who also was Logan County's census taker, and commissioner of school lands.

The town of Man, West Virginia, is named for the last syllable of Hinchman's name.

References

Members of the West Virginia House of Delegates
Physicians from West Virginia